Gombodorjiin Enebish (born 20 April 1970) is a Mongolian weightlifter. He competed in the men's middleweight event at the 1992 Summer Olympics.

References

External links
 

1970 births
Living people
Mongolian male weightlifters
Olympic weightlifters of Mongolia
Weightlifters at the 1992 Summer Olympics
Place of birth missing (living people)
20th-century Mongolian people